Classics Volume One, also stylised as Classics, Vol. 1, is the fifth public album by the group Two Steps From Hell, released in June 2013. It consists of 23 tracks written by composers Thomas J. Bergersen and Nick Phoenix. This album is the first of their public albums available in lossless audio. All songs except "Return from Darkness" and "Path to Earth" are from their previous demonstration albums. The album also features an extended version of "Eternal Sorrow" from the Nemesis album, as well as tweaked versions of "Magnan Imus", "White Witch", and "The World Is Mind".

The album was later re-released to the industry via Extreme Music, containing two new brand-new bonus tracks.

Track listing
Tracks 3, 8, 17, and 22 are reworked versions from their original releases.

Two slightly different versions of the album were released; the seventh track issued on iTunes and CD Baby is different to the seventh track issued via Amazon Music.

Critical reception
IFMCA-associated reviews website, MundoBSO, rated it six out of ten stars.

Charts

Use in media
Two Steps From Hell's music has been used frequently in movie trailers. 
Nemesis was used in TV spots for 2012.
Armada was used in the trailers for The Chronicles of Narnia: The Voyage of the Dawn Treader, The Three Musketeers, The Mummy: Tomb of the Dragon Emperor, and Mass Effect 3.
Sons of War was used in the trailer for Your Highness and commercials for some Marvel shows, such as Agents of SHIELD and the third season of the animated series Ultimate Spider-Man.
The Calgary Flames used this song in their 2011-2012 season opening video.
Asimov was used in an episode of The Innovators: The Men Who Built America.
White Witch was used in the second trailer for the first season of Penny Dreadful and the trailer for King Lear.
Magnan Imus was used in the second trailer for the first season of Penny Dreadful.

References

External links

2013 albums
Two Steps from Hell albums